Blattisocius is a genus of mites in the family Blattisociidae.

Species (18)
 Blattisocius aegypticus Nasr, Nawar & Afifi, 1988      
 Blattisocius apis Basha & Yousef, 2001      
 Blattisocius apisassociae Chinniah & Mohanasundaram, 1995      
 Blattisocius capsicum Basha & Yousef, 2001
 Blattisocius changjiangensis (Ma, 2006)
 Blattisocius daci (Narayan & Ghai, 1961)      
 Blattisocius dentriticus (Berlese, 1918)
 Blattisocius dolichus Ma, 2006
 Blattisocius edentata (Karg, 1976)
 Blattisocius everti Britto, Lopes & De Moraes, 2012 
 Blattisocius incisus Bhattacharyya, 1977      
 Blattisocius keegani Fox, 1947
 Blattisocius mali (Oudemans, 1929)
 Blattisocius patagiorum Treat, 1966
 Blattisocius quadridentatus Haines, 1979      
 Blattisocius tarsalis (Berlese, 1918)
 Blattisocius thaicocofloris Oliveira, Chandrapatya & De Moraes, 2015
 Blattisocius urticana (Nesbitt, 1954)

Possibly also: 
 Blattisocius othreisae Chinniah & Mohanasundaram, 1995

References

Acari genera
Mesostigmata